Berrueces de Campos is a municipality of 109 people of Valladolid province in the autonomous community of Castile-Leon, Spain.  Its major landmark is the local church.

Municipalities in the Province of Valladolid